New Amsterdam Singers is an avocational chorus based in New York City which specializes in a cappella and double chorus repertoire and regularly performs contemporary and commissioned works.

Clara Longstreth has served as music director of the chorus since 1968.

History 
New Amsterdam Singers formed in 1971 from the remains of the Master Institute Chorus. Associated with the Bloomingdale House of Music from 1972 to 1978, the chorus became independent in 1978 and operates as a 501(c)(3) non-profit organization under the management of an elected board of directors. Noted for its "adventurous" programming and "handsome" performances, the chorus presents three subscriptions concerts per season at venues such as Merkin Hall, Holy Trinity Lutheran Church, Immanuel Lutheran Church and St. Peter's Church at Citicorp. The chorus rehearses at Broadway Presbyterian Church on the upper west side of Manhattan.

In addition to performing lesser-known works by major composers, the chorus has commissioned works by Paul Alan Levi (2011, 2002, 1994), Ronald Perera (2008, 1999), Behzad Ranjbaran (1999), Thomas Beveridge (1987) and Frances Heilbut (1974) and has premiered works by Kirke Mechem, Abbie Betinis, Alex Weiser, Charles Fussell, Matthew Harris, Daniel Pinkham, Michael Dellaira, and Mark Kilstofte, among others.

Collaborations 
The chorus has performed under the batons of Everett Lee (1976), Leonard Bernstein (1984), Newell Jenkins (1986) and Marin Alsop (1998) and has collaborated with diverse amateur and professional arts organizations including:
Broadway Bach Ensemble (2010)
Nimbus Dance Works (2009)
Lark Quartet (2008)
Matt Haimovitz (2007)
Park Avenue Chamber Symphony (2005,2016)
Mannes College Orchestra (2000)
Anonymous Four (1998)
José Limon Dance Company (1997)

International Tours 
The chorus has toured regularly since 1985, performing in major halls and cathedrals in Greece, Spain, Poland, Portugal, England, Ireland, France, Turkey, Sweden, Italy, Russia, Latvia, Estonia, Argentina and Uruguay. In the summer of 2010, the chorus presented a series of concerts in Cuba, and in 2013, performed as part of a choral festival in South Africa.

Recordings 
The chorus has made 2 original recordings, American Journey: Poetry and Song in the Twentieth Century (1993) and (2003), and released a 2-disc 40th Anniversary Collection of its best performances in 2008.

References

External links 
 New Amsterdam Singers website
 Broadway Presbyterian Church website
 Ronald Perera website
 Nimbus Dance Works website
 Broadway Bach Ensemble website

Choirs in New York City
Musical groups from New York City
1971 establishments in New York City
Musical groups established in 1971